This is a list of the Luxembourg national football team results from 2000 to the end of 2019.

2000s

2000

2001

2002

2003

2004

2005

2006

2007

2008

2009

2010s

2010

2011

2012

2013

2014

2015

2016

2017

2018

2019

References 

 
National team
Luxembourg national football team results